The Popular Resistance Committees (PRC) (Lijān al-Muqāwama al-Shaʿbiyya) is a coalition of a number of armed Palestinian groups opposed to what they regard as the conciliatory approach of the Palestinian Authority and Fatah towards Israel. The PRC is especially active in the Gaza Strip, through its military wing, the Al-Nasser Salah al-Deen Brigades. The PRC has planned and executed a number of varied operations, but specializes in planting roadside bombs and vehicle explosive charges - directed against military and civilian convoys.

Formed in late 2000 by former Fatah and Tanzim member Jamal Abu Samhadana, the PRC is composed primarily of ex-Fatah fighters and Al-Aqsa Martyrs' Brigades members and is alleged by Israel to be inspired and financed by Hezbollah. The present leader of PRC is Ayman al-Shashniya.

The PRC is believed to be the third strongest faction active in the Gaza Strip, after Hamas and Islamic Jihad, and has been designated a terrorist organization by Israel and the United States.

History
The PRC was formed in late 2000 by former Fatah and Tanzim member Jamal Abu Samhadana, and is composed primarily of ex-Fatah fighters and al-Aqsa Martyrs' Brigades members.

On 15 October 2003, explosives destroyed a US diplomatic convoy at Beit Hanoun, killing three security guards and severely wounding a diplomat. The PRC initially claimed responsibility for the attack, but later denied carrying out the attack, saying it was against Palestinian interests. The US demanded that the Palestinian National Authority find those responsible and bring them to justice. Palestinian officials said that because of lack of progress in the attack investigation, the US halted financial support for the PA and placed unofficial sanctions on its accounts. After heavy US pressure, the Palestinian Authority arrested several PRC members, accusing them of being responsible. The PRC confirmed the men were PRC members. The PA tried the four "suspects" in a Palestinian military court, but intelligence agencies dismissed the tribunal as a "mock trial" and said while the suspects were PRC activists, they were not those responsible for the attack. The men were released in March 2004.

The Jenin Martyr's Brigade was formed in March 2003 as a part of the PRC. Besides other activities, the JMB claimed responsibility for the March 2003 bombing of an Israeli bus in Haifa. The bus was blown to pieces when a suicide bomber, seated in the rear of the vehicle, detonated 10-15 kilograms of shrapnel-laced explosives that were attached to his body. 16 people died in the blast, and another 30-40 were injured. On 17 July 2004, the group kidnapped Palestinian Civil Police Forces Chief Ghazi al-Jabali at gunpoint in an ambush of his convoy which wounded two bodyguards. Al-Jabali was only released after Palestinian President Yasser Arafat agreed to PRC demands that he be fired.

The PRC are also involved in Rafah's smuggling tunnels which have been used to smuggle weapons, explosives, fugitives and civilian supplies etc.

The PRC claimed responsibility for the assassination of Moussa Arafat on 7 September 2005.

On 8 June 2006, PRC leader Jamal Abu Samhadana was killed by IDF forces, along with at least three other PRC members. As the man considered responsible for a number of attacks, including the bombing of a children's school bus near Kfar Darom in November 2000 and for the 2003 infiltration into an IDF outpost in Rafah that left several soldiers dead, he was considered one of the most wanted Palestinians on the IDF's hit-list.

On Sunday, 25 June 2006, the PRC, together with Hamas and Jaish al-Islam ("the Army of Islam"), launched a major attack via a tunnel near the Kerem Shalom outpost. Eight Palestinian fighters used a nearly one kilometre tunnel that they had dug over the past several months to cross under the border between Gaza and Israel. The surprise attack ended with two Israeli soldiers dead and four wounded and the capture of Corporal Gilad Shalit. Two of the Palestinian attackers were killed while the other six made it back to the Gaza Strip with Shalit. Shalit was released five years later in a prisoner exchange.

The same day of the tunnel attack, Eliyahu Asheri, an 18-year-old Israeli student, went missing near the West Bank. The PRC shortly claimed responsibility for kidnapping and murdering him. Spokesman for the group, Abu Abir, also announced that the PRC had formed special units in the West Bank whose sole purpose is to kidnap soldiers and settlers, in accordance with the continued Operation "Cavaliers' Wrath."

On 8 August 2007, the PRC announced that it would form a political party to run in future Palestinian elections.  It vowed, however, to keep its armed wing intact. In February 2008 then PRC leader 'Amir Qarmoot Abu As-Sa'id was killed in an Israeli airstrike.

On 18 August 2011, Israel accused the PRC of committing the 2011 southern Israel attacks in which 8 Israelis were killed in firing and suicide bombing on two buses and a car near the Israeli-Egyptian border north to Eilat. On the evening of the same day, the Israeli Air Force, working with Shin Bet, bombed the homes of PRC members in Rafah. Among the dead, as identified by the group, were their commander, Kamal al-Nairab and Immad Hammad, chief of its military wing Al-Nasser Salah al-Deen Brigades, and at least two more top members of the group and another member. The PRC responded to the raids in saying that it vows "double" revenge for the attack.

On 9 March 2012, an Israeli airstrike in Gaza killed PRC secretary-general Zuhir al-Qaisi (Zuhair al-Qaissi) as well as Mahmoud Hanani.

In July 2013, Hamas cracked down on PRC activities in Gaza, arresting a number of PRC members.

Activities
The PRC have been involved in a number of bombing attacks on both military and civilian targets in the Gaza Strip, including:

 The 20 November 2000 bombing of a bus full of children as it passed near Kfar Darom, killing two
 The 8 October 2000 shooting attack on a bus carrying airport workers near the Rafah terminal, wounding 8 civilians, and a similar attack on a car on the road from Kerem Shalom to the Rafah terminal, killing the woman driver
 The 28 April 2001 mortar attacks on the Netzer Hazani agricultural Israeli settlement in the Gaza Strip (wounding five, one seriously), and similar attacks on Kfar Darom on 29 April and on Atzmona on 7 May of the same year.
 The February 14, 2002 killing of three Israeli soldiers using large explosive charges designed for tanks, and similar killings of three more soldiers on March 14 and one more on September 5 of that same year.
 The May 2, 2004 killing of the unarmed and pregnant Tali Hatuel, and her four daughters aged 2 to 11, on Kissufim road. The PRC and Islamic Jihad jointly claimed responsibility, also claiming that the attack was in retaliation for earlier Israeli Defense Forces (IDF) killings of Sheikh Ahmed Yassin and Abdel Aziz al-Rantissi.
 The January 13, 2005 killing of six Israeli settlers at the Karni Passage near Gaza, carried out together with Hamas and the al-Aqsa Martyrs' Brigades.
 On February 4, 2008 the Israeli Air Force assassinated the PRC's top military leader, Amer Qarmut (Abu Said) in response to a joint suicide bombing by the al-Aqsa Martyrs Brigades and the Popular Front for the Liberation of Palestine in Dimona, which killed one Israeli.
 On March 6, 2008 the PRC detonated a roadside charge near the Kissufim crossing, killing an Israeli officer and wounding three others, one critically.

Hezbollah connection
According to Israel, the relation between the PRC and Hezbollah is more than coincidental. Israel alleges the organization enjoys financing and technical support from Hezbollah since its founding, and is a sort of proxy of Hezbollah's influence in the Gaza Strip.  The organization outwardly projects this relation through its mimicry of the Hezbollah flag which also bears a fist clenching a Kalashnikov rifle and  stylized writing.

However, in recent times since the start of the Syrian Civil War the group has distanced itself from Hezbollah and Iran even condemning them for their involvement in the war, the group released a video in June 2016 called "One Nation" where they showed signs labeled with various cities including Aleppo, Gaza, Jerusalem, Fallujah, and Sana covered in blood referencing confrontations involving Iranian backed militias such as the Battle of Aleppo and Battle of Fallujah (2016), while a speaker from the group discussed the group's solidarity with Sunnis affected by the conflicts in Iraq, Syria, and Yemen.

Notes

External links 
 The Leading Palestinian Terrorist Organizations (August 2004) from the Intelligence and Terrorism Information Center at the Center for Special Studies (C.S.S)
 The Resistance Committees: Between a Movement and a Party
  Salah al-Deen Brigades Official website

Popular Resistance Committees, The
Islamist insurgent groups
Organizations based in Asia designated as terrorist
Axis of Resistance